Karaman railway station is a station in Karaman, Turkey. Situated in the northern part of the city, it is served by the Taurus Express and the Konya-Karaman Regional, which totals to three daily trains, in each direction. Karaman station also part of the Polatlı-Konya high-speed railway extension, which opened in 2021. 

Until the high-speed railway extension is complete, TCDD Taşımacılık operates two daily regional trains that serves as a connection to high-speed trains in Konya.

References

External links
ankara karaman hızlı tren (Turkish)
istanbul karaman hızlı tren (Turkish)

Railway stations in Karaman Province
Railway stations opened in 1904
1904 establishments in the Ottoman Empire
Karaman